Kayamkulam is a town and municipality in the Onattukara region of Alappuzha district in Kerala. It is the second biggest town in Alappuzha district. It is located on the western coast of India, and was an ancient maritime trading center. One of the largest thermal power plants in Kerala, the Rajiv Gandhi Combined Cycle Power Plant run by the NTPC, is situated at Haripad. Kayamkulam is part of the Karthikappally tehsil. Krishnapuram Palace is located nearby.

History

Kayamkulam was a medieval feudal kingdom known as Odanad ruled by the Kayamkulam rajas. Maha Raja Marthanda Varma (1706–58) conquered Kayamkulam and annexed its territories to Travancore.

Tourist attractions
The Krishnapuram Palace, built in the 18th century, now functions as a museum. Constructed in typical Keralan-style architecture, it has the largest mural painting in Kerala. The palace museum houses the Kayamkulam double-edged sword.

The Kayamkulam Boat Race is held on the fourth Saturday of August every year. Chinese fishing nets can be found on the banks of the lagoon.
Veliyaazheekal is a beach at Arattupuzha panchayat in Kayamkulam.The main attraction in this place bow string arch Bridge (biggest one of South India).

Transport

Roads
NH 66 passes through Kayamkulam, connecting it to the major cities Alappuzha, Kochi, Thiruvananthapuram, Thrissur, Kollam, Palakkad and Nagercoil. The Kayamkulam–Punalur road is a major road connecting it to major city's in east sengotai,Tenkasi,Thirunelveli via Pettah parts of the Tamil Nadu state. The KSRTC bus station is located near the national highway.

Railways

Demographics 
According to the 2001 Census of India, Kayamkulam had a population of 65,299. Males constituted 49% of the population and females 51%. Kayamkulam had an average literacy rate of 82%, higher than the national average of 59.5%. Male literacy was 84%, and female literacy is 79%. In Kayamkulam, 11% of the population was under 6 years of age.

Civic administration
Kayamkulam Assembly Constituency is part of Alappuzha.

Educational and research institutes

The Central Coconut Research Station (CCRS) was established in 1948 as a field station of the Agricultural Research Laboratory. Presently, it is a regional station of the Central Plantation Crops Research Institute (CPCRI).

Onattukara Regional Agricultural Research Station , Kayamkulam is located in the Kayamkulam Municipality of Alappuzha District, one kilometer east of Kayamkulam town, on the northern side of Kayamkulam - Punalur road. The station was established in the year 1937 under the erstwhile University of Travancore. It was subsequently transferred to the Department of Agriculture in 1958 and continued to function under it till it became a part of the KAU on 07.02.72. I n April, 2000, this Station was upgraded to the status of RARS (Onattukara Region).

KPAC drama troupe

Kerala People's Arts Club (KPAC) is a theatrical movement in Kayamkulam, Kerala. It was formed in the 1950s by a group of individuals that had close ties with the leftist parties of Kerala.

In 1951 KPAC staged its first drama, Ente Makananu Sari, whose songs were written by Punaloor Balan. Its second drama Ningalenne Communistakki was first performed in 1952. The success of Ningalenne Communistakki brought KPAC to the forefront of a powerful people's theatre movement in Kerala.

KPAC played a significant role in popularising the Communist Party in Kerala through its dramas, road shows and kathaprasangams (story telling).

Power plant 
The Rajiv Gandhi Combined Cycle Power Plant is a combined cycle power plant located in Cheppad, Haripad, Alappuzha district, Kerala.

Notable people

 Thopil Bhasi – Malayalam playwright, screenwriter, and film director
K. M. Cherian – heart surgeon; founder of Frontier Lifeline Hospital and the Dr. K M Cherian Heart Foundation
 Kambisseri Karunakaran – journalist, politician, actor, satirist and rationalist
 P. Kesavadev – novelist, writer, and social reformer
 Kayamkulam Kochunni – highwayman based in Kayamkulam, active in Central Travancore in the early 19th century
 K. P. A. C. Lalitha – National Award-winning Indian film and stage actress
  S. Guptan Nair – Malayalam writer, critic, scholar and educationist
 K. Shankar Pillai – cartoonist, founder of Shankar's Weekly
 Resul Pookutty – Oscar-winning Indian film sound designer, sound editor and mixer
 Thachadi Prabhakaran – former Minister of Kerala
 Kayamkulam Philipose Ramban – Christian priest
 T. P. Sreenivasan - diplomat; former High Commissioner to Fiji and Kenya and Ambassador to Austria

See also
 Pathiyoor
 Kattanam
 Charummood
 Mavelikkara
 Adoor
 Pandalam
 Chengannur
 Mannar
 Vallikunnam
 Alappuzha (Lok Sabha constituency)
 Oachira
 Padanilam
 Chettikulangara
 Puthuppally

References

External links
Kerala Agricultural University

Cities and towns in Alappuzha district